Mousetrap is the name of a game introduced by the English mathematician Arthur Cayley. In the game, cards numbered  through  ("say thirteen" in Cayley's original article) are shuffled to place them in some random permutation and are arranged in a circle with their faces up. Then, starting with the first card, the player begins counting  and moving to the next card as the count is incremented. If the player ever removes all of the cards from the permutation in this manner, then the player wins. If the player reaches the count  and cards still remain, then the game is lost. 

In order for at least one card to be removed, the initial permutation of the cards must not be a derangement. However, this is not a sufficient condition for winning, because it does not take into account subsequent removals. The number of ways the cards can be arranged such that the entire game is won,  for n = 1, 2, ..., are
 1, 1, 2, 6, 15, 84, 330, 1812, 9978, 65503, ... .

For example with four cards, the probability of winning is 0.25, but this reduces as the number of cards increases, and with thirteen cards it is about 0.0046.

References
. University of Göttingen Göttinger Digitalisierungszentrum (GDZ) scan
.
.
.

External links 
 

Mathematical games